Tempe High School may refer to these high schools:

 Tempe High School (Sydney), Australia
 Tempe High School (Arizona), United States